The Jewish American Society for Historic Preservation (JASHP) is an American non-profit 501(c)(3) volunteer historical society. The society locates sites of American and Jewish historical interest and importance. It works with local community organizations, synagogues, churches, historical societies, governments and individuals, to erect interpretive historical markers that help illuminate the American-Jewish experience and reflect on the commonality of being American.

JASHP was founded in 1999 after the discovery by the founder, Jerry Klinger, of the first permanent Jewish house of worship in the territory of New Mexico (Temple Montefiore, Las Vegas, N.M.). JASHP has completed projects in 40 states and in 6 countries. Projects are constantly being developed and proposals are welcomed. Over 7,000,000 people a year benefit from JASHP projects. The society is a small organization. Each program is individualized with organizational participation from as few as two or three people to as many as 300. Considering JASHP's size, its impact has been disproportionately large.

JASHP is the recipient of Hadassah's Myrtle Wreath Award, which is "given to individuals and non-profit organizations which have made significant humanitarian contributions to our community."

Programs

JASHP has completed programs in the following states reflecting on the Jewish American experience:
 Alabama – Mobile, Shaare Shomayim - Gates of Heaven, first permanent Jewish house of worship in Alabama - 1841 
 
 Arkansas – Little Rock
Concordia Hall 
Broncho Billy Anderson, The First Cowboy Western Movie Star 
 Colorado – Cotopaxi, Russian Jewish Cemetery - 1882–1884 
 Congressional Medal of Honor Private Benjamin Levy,
First Jewish American to earn the MOH -1862 
 Connecticut – Groton, Jews and the American Navy 
 Delaware – Wilmington, Ohabe Shalom, First Permanent Jewish House of Worship in Delaware - 1880 
 Florida, Pensacola, Temple Beth El, First Permanent Jewish House of Worship in Florida, 1876 
 Florida, Palm Beach
Wakodahatchee Wetlands 
Green Cay Wetlands 
 Iowa – Keokuk, B'Nai Israel Congregation, First Permanent Jewish House of Worship in Iowa - 1855 
 Kansas – Kansas City, Jewish American and World War I 
 Kansas – Leavenworth, Temple B'Nai Jeshurun, First Permanent Jewish House of Worship in Kansas - 1866 
 Louisiana – New Orleans
Shangarai Chasset, First Permanent Jewish House of Worship in Louisiana - 1845 
Touro Infirmary 

 Maine – Bangor, Congregation Beth Israel, First Permanent Jewish House of Worship - 1897 

 Maryland – Montgomery County, Sophia Chamys, victim of white slavery 
 Maryland – Hagerstown, Thomas Kennedy, Jew Bill of Maryland 
 Minnesota – Saint Paul, Mt. Zion Temple, first permanent Jewish House of Worship in Minnesota - 1856 
 Mississippi – Jackson, Temple Beth Israel, first permanent Jewish house of worship in Mississippi - 1867 
 Mississippi – Natchez, Temple B'Nai Israel, first organized Jewish house of worship in Mississippi 
 Montana – Helena, Temple Emanuel, first permanent Jewish house of worship in Montana - 1890 

 Nebraska – Omaha, Congregation of Israel, first permanent Jewish house of worship in Nebraska - 1884 
 Nevada – Virginia City
Engineering Marvels of the Comstock 
Virginia City Jewish Cemetery - 1862 
 New Hampshire – Portsmouth, Temple Israel, First Permanent House of Worship - 1910 

 New Jersey – Roosevelt, Jersey Homesteads 
 New Mexico – Las Vegas, Congregation Montefiore, First Permanent Jewish House of Worship in New Mexico - 1884 
 New York – Buffalo, Mordechai Noah and Ararat 

 North Dakota – Valley City,#Herman Stern, Holocaust rescuer 
 North Dakota – Ashley Jewish Cemetery, NRHP 
 North Dakota – Bonanazaville, North Dakota Jewry 
 Oklahoma – Oklahoma City, Temple B'Nai Israel, First Permanent Jewish House of Worship in Oklahoma - 1908 
 Pennsylvania – Lancaster, Joseph Simon, Jewish American frontiersman 
 South Dakota
Jews of Deadwood 

Mount Rushmore National Monument 
Mount Rushmore National Monument, "Father of Mt. Rushmore" 
Congregation Sons of Israel, Sioux Falls, First Permanent Jewish House of Worship in South Dakota - 1916 
 Tennessee –   1. Memphis, Congregation Children of Israel, First Permanent Jewish House of Worship in Tennessee - 1854.         2. Knoxville, Master Sgt. Roddie Edmonds, Righteous Among the Nations for saving Jewish POWs, WWII - https://www.hmdb.org/m.asp?m=160252

 Utah, Clarion
Jewish Agricultural Settlement - 1911 
 Utah – Salt Lake City
Congregation B'Nai Israel, First Permanent Jewish House of Worship in Utah - 1883 
 Utah – Wild Horse Butte
Solomon Carvalho - John C. Fremont Expedition of exploration 1853–54 
 Virginia – Richmond, Kahal Kadosh Beth Shalome, First Permanent Jewish House of Worship in Virginia - 1789 
 Washington – Spokane, Temple Emanuel, First Permanent Jewish House of worship in Washington State - 1892 
 West Virginia – Charleston, Temple Israel, first permanent Jewish house of worship in West Virginia - 1873 
 Wyoming – Cheyenne, Mt. Sinai Congregation, first permanent Jewish house of worship in Wyoming - 1915

Special programs
 Leo Frank, Marietta, Georgia
 Leo Frank Lynching 
 Stephen Norman, Jerusalem, Israel
 The last descendant of Theodor Herzl - the father of the modern State of Israel 
 Four Chaplains, Memorial - U.S. Naval Academy, Annapolis, Maryland
 U.S. Naval Academy, Annapolis, Maryland 
 American Holocaust Memorials

 Paramaribo, Suriname
Holocaust and Memory

International projects

 John Henry Patterson, Avihayil, Israel
 Godfather of the Israel Defense Forces 
 Buchenwald Concentration Camp, Weimar, Germany
 The "Kleine Lager" Memorial 

 Adam Worth, London, England
 The Napoleon of Crime 
 Rev. William Hechler - First Christian Zionist, London, England
 Joan Winters, Jerusalem, Israel
 Paramaribo, Suriname, Holocaust and Memory

 SS Exodus, Haifa, Israel
Exodus - 1947, the iconic American Holocaust rescue ship 
Bill Bernstein - American second officer on the Exodus murdered during the British attack

Charitable sponsorships
 Hero Miles - Fisher House Foundation

JASHP articles on American Jewish history
 Kahal HaKadosh Beit Elohim, Charleston, S.C.
 American Holocaust Memorializations
 Reverend John Stanley Grauel - Secret Haganah operative on the S.S. Exodus
 American Jewish History,
 Zionism and Israel

See also
The Jacob Rader Marcus Center of the American Jewish Archives

References

External links
https://www.tuskegee.edu/news/new-historic-trail-honoring-tuskegee-area-civil-rights-trailblazers-to-be-dedicated-sept-20
http://www.thechronicle-news.com/arts_and_entertainment/temple-aaron-stands-will-continue-to-stand-as-a-monument/article_02b49cd0-99d9-11e9-b4d4-8b9f635ca634.html
https://atlantajewishtimes.timesofisrael.com/my-tribute-to-klinger/
http://forward.com/culture/345517/heres-how-one-man-has-preserved-the-milestones-of-jewish-history/
The Jewish American Society for Historic Preservation
American Jewish Yearbook - 2014 
Georgia Historical Society - Leo Frank marker 
http://www.jpost.com/International/Christian-leader-pivotal-to-Herzls-work-recognized
http://www.breakingchristiannews.com/articles/display_art.html?ID=8648
http://njjewishnews.com/article/31668/new-roosevelt-marker-celebrates-jewish-roots
http://www.startribune.com/celebrating-160-years-of-jewish-life-in-minnesota/421571443/
 Israel, Jewish leaders pay respects to first Christian Zionist - israel today | Israel News
 Jewish Post and News
 Jerusalem Plans a Hero’s Burial for Long-Deceased Grandson of Herzl – Forward.com
Frank marker removed for roadwork
historical marker dedicated at Wild Horse Butte
http://www.jpost.com/Diaspora/Jerusalem-monument-to-be-dedicated-to-Machal-517548
http://www.thechronicle-news.com/local/temple-aaron-unveils-new-historical-marker-celebrates--years/article_0f61cb2e-979a-11e9-920e-43db107811cd.html

Jewish organizations based in the United States
Historic preservation organizations in the United States